City of Maryborough was the name of two former local governments in Australia:

 City of Maryborough (Queensland)
 City of Maryborough (Victoria)